The Bush River is a tributary of the Columbia River in the Columbia Country of southeastern British Columbia, Canada, entering that river via the Bush Arm of Kinbasket Lake. The Bush has also been designated the North Fork Bush River, while the Valenciennes was known as the South Fork Bush River (renamed in 1918); — Bush Pass is at the head of the Valenciennes, rather than the Bush.

See also
Tributaries of the Columbia River

References

Rivers of British Columbia
Tributaries of the Columbia River
Columbia Country
Rivers of the Canadian Rockies